Balakhu is a village development committee in Okhaldhunga District in the Sagarmatha Zone of mid-eastern Nepal. Balakhu Village is located on the bank of Sunkoshi river at the south western part of Okhaldhunga District.At the time of the 1991 Nepal census it had a population of 3703 living in 677 individual households. Simalchaur

References

External links
UN map of the municipalities of Okhaldhunga District

Populated places in Okhaldhunga District